The 2009 ISF Men's World Championship was an international softball tournament. The final was held in Saskatoon, Canada on 26 July 2009. It was the 12th time the World Championship took place. Sixteen nations competed, including defending champions New Zealand.

In the end, Australia won over runner-up New Zealand.

First round

Group A

Group B

Play-offs

Final

Final standings

External links
Official website
Final standings

References

ISF Men's World Championship
Sports competitions in Saskatoon
2009 in Canadian sports
Men's Softball World Championship
International softball competitions hosted by Canada
July 2009 sports events in Canada
2009 in Saskatchewan